The 2018 Visit Panamá Cup was a professional tennis tournament played on clay courts. It was the fifth edition of the tournament which was part of the 2018 ATP Challenger Tour. It took place in Panama City, Panama between 2 and 7 April 2018.

Singles main-draw entrants

Seeds

 1 Rankings are as of 19 March 2018.

Other entrants
The following players received wildcards into the singles main draw:
  Emilio Gómez
  José Gilbert Gómez
  Sebastian Korda
  Renzo Olivo

The following players received entry into the singles main draw as alternates:
  Andrea Basso
  Rubin Statham

The following player received entry into the singles main draw as a special exempt:
  Pedro Sakamoto

The following players received entry from the qualifying draw:
  Juan Ignacio Londero
  Cristian Rodríguez
  Evan Song
  Peter Torebko

The following player received entry as a lucky loser:
  Felipe Mantilla

Champions

Singles

 Carlos Berlocq def.  Blaž Rola 6–2, 6–0.

Doubles

 Yannick Hanfmann /  Kevin Krawietz def.  Nathan Pasha /  Roberto Quiroz 7–6(7–4), 6–4.

References

Visit Panamá Cup
2018
Visit Panamá Cup